A list of films produced in Hong Kong in 1976:.

A–M

N–Z

External links
 IMDB list of Hong Kong films
 Hong Kong films of 1976 at HKcinemamagic.com

1976
Films
Hong Kong